Elections to Cannock Chase District Council took place on 7 May 2015 on the same day as other local elections in England as well as a general election. A third of the council was up for election, meaning a total of 15 councillors were elected from all of the council's wards.

The Labour Party held control of the council but with a reduced majority of two compared with the previous election. Labour gained a seat from the Liberal Democrats in Brereton and Ravenhill but suffered a net loss of three due to losses elsewhere.

The Conservative Party won the highest number of seats and votes, gaining four seats from Labour and one from the Lib Dems as well as holding the four seats they had won at the 2011 election. They also regained two seats from councillors who had defected since 2011, one who went to UKIP and one who became an independent.

UKIP came a strong third, gaining over 20% of the votes but no seats, leaving them with five seats on the council, meaning they lost their status as the main opposition party. The Liberal Democrats saw their vote share collapse and they lost the two seats they had won in 2011, leaving them with one councillor. The Green Party contested an election in the district for the first time, putting up a candidate in every ward and coming fourth in terms of vote share.

Results

|}

Council Composition
Prior to the election, the composition of the council was:

After the election, the composition of the council was:

Ward results
Vote share changes are based on the results achieved by parties in 2011 when these seats were last contested.

Brereton and Ravenhill

Cannock East

Cannock North

Cannock South

Cannock West

Etching Hill and the Heath

Hagley

Hawks Green

^ John Bernard was the sitting councillor for the Hawks Green ward and previously defected from the Conservatives to UKIP.

Heath Hayes East and Wimblebury

Hednesford Green Heath

Hednesford North

Hednesford South

Norton Canes

Rawnsley

Western Springs

References

2015 English local elections
May 2015 events in the United Kingdom
2015
2010s in Staffordshire